Tadó is a municipality and town in the Chocó Department, Colombia.

Climate
Tadó has an extremely wet tropical rainforest climate (Af) with very heavy to extremely heavy rainfall year-round.

References

Municipalities of Chocó Department